Oriental College of Education (OCE), established in 2004, is situated at Sanpada, Navi Mumbai. It delivers bachelor's degree-level course in Teacher education with the duration of one academic year and the proposed intake is 100 students. It is approved by the National Council for Teacher Education (NCTE) and affiliated with the University of Mumbai.

Course offered
 Bachelor of Education (B.Ed.)
Specialisation in:
 English
 Hindi
 Marathi
 Mathematics
 Science
 History
 Geography
 Economics

Affiliation
OCE is affiliated to University of Mumbai.

Education in Navi Mumbai
Engineering colleges in Mumbai